Decodes basiplagana is a moth of the  family Tortricidae. It is widespread in North America, including Illinois, Massachusetts, Minnesota, New Jersey, Oklahoma, Ontario, Tennessee and Wisconsin

The length of the forewings is 8.1–9 mm. Adults have gray forewings with a strongly arched costa. The forewing pattern varies greatly. While some specimens have well defined dark gray and black fasciate markings, others are unmarked.

The larvae feed on Quercus lobata.

External links
mothphotographersgroup
Bug Guide
Factsheet

Cnephasiini